Bane was originally a comic book character and Batman's adversary, but has appeared in several other forms of media. He has been portrayed in live action by Robert Swenson in Batman & Robin, Tom Hardy in The Dark Knight Rises, and Shane West in Gotham.

Henry Silva, Joaquim de Almeida, Ron Perlman, Clancy Brown, Michael Dorn, Danny Trejo, Héctor Elizondo, Carlos Alazraqui, Fred Tatasciore, Jason Liebrecht, Steve Blum, JB Blanc, Doug Benson, and James Adomian have all provided voice work for the character. Peter Marinker voices Bane in the radio adaption of Batman: Knightfall.


Television

Live-action

Arrowverse
 In the second part of the fifth annual Arrowverse crossover event "Elseworlds", Bane's mask from The Dark Knight Rises (as well as other villains' belongings) can be seen inside the storage room at Arkham Asylum.
In the Batwoman episode "Kane, Kate", a brainwashed Kate stole all of Batman's trophies belonging to his enemies from the Batcave which includes Bane's Venom and used it on Russell Tavaroff in the season 2 finale episode "Power".

Gotham

 Bane appears in the fifth and final season of Gotham, portrayed by Shane West. This version of the character is Eduardo Dorrance, Jim Gordon's (Ben McKenzie) former army buddy, who leads the military group "Delta Force" seemingly to help Gordon and the GCPD in their war against Gotham City's criminal element after the city is rendered a "No Man's Land". In the past after Gordon's line of duty was over, Dorrance and his men became prisoners of war and were incarcerated at Pena Duro. He was later freed by Nyssa al Ghul (Jaime Murray), who enlists him to help in her plan to kill Bruce Wayne (David Mazouz) to avenge her father Ra's al Ghul (Alexander Siddig), and to destroy Gotham. When confronting Gordon at the ruins of Haven, Dorrance fights Gordon until he is impaled onto a pipe. Nyssa finds him and rehabilitates his body with armor and a respirator, with help from Hugo Strange (B.D. Wong). Reborn as Bane, he leads a mission to capture Gordon, Bruce, and Barbara Kean (Erin Richards). Bane later takes control of the military and battles the GCPD, who are joined by Oswald Cobblepot (Robin Lord Taylor) and Edward Nygma (Cory Michael Smith). When Gordon and the others talk the military out of not following Bane's orders, Bane and Delta Force are arrested by the military.

Animation

DC Animated Universe

Even though the producers were reluctant to use the character as they felt his comic incarnation was too gimmicky, Bane still appeared in the DC Animated Universe, voiced primarily by Henry Silva.

 Bane made his animated debut in Batman: The Animated Series, voiced by Henry Silva with a strong Latin American accent. This version is a former inmate of a Cuban prison containing the most dangerous convicts ever captured. While imprisoned, Bane was chosen as a test subject for the government project "Gilgamesh" to create super-soldiers with the drug Venom. Although the experiment was a success, Bane used his newfound superhuman abilities to escape and become a professional assassin. In his self-titled episode, Bane is hired by crime boss Rupert Thorne to kill Batman. However, the Dark Knight ultimately defeats Bane by causing his Venom pump module to malfunction, by stabbing the switch with a Batarang.
 Bane returns in The New Batman Adventures, voiced again by Henry Silva but now with an American accent. His redesigned outfit is now completely black while his traditional luchador mask has been traded for a black gimp mask. In the episode "Over the Edge", Batgirl's death at Scarecrow's hands eventually leads to Commissioner James Gordon granting Bane an early release from Stonegate Penitentiary exchange for assistance in the Dark Knight's apprehension. However, Bane betrays Gordon and prepares to both kill him and Batman. It is then revealed that the entire episode was merely Barbara Gordon's fear-induced nightmare caused by the Scarecrow's toxin.
 Bane later appears in the Superman: The Animated Series episode "Knight Time", with Henry Silva reprising the role. After Batman mysteriously disappears, Bane conspires with the Riddler and Mad Hatter to take over Gotham in his absence. However, they are defeated by Superman and Robin, the former disguised as Batman.
 Bane appears as one of the antagonists in the 2003 direct-to-video fiml Batman: Mystery of the Batwoman, voiced by Héctor Elizondo. He is hired by the Penguin and Rupert Thorne to provide security for an arms deal with the Kaznian military, as their former "muscle" Carlton Duquesne has been unable to do so ever since the Batwoman's emergence. After capturing Batwoman aboard Penguin's yacht, Bane reveals to his employers that the vigilante's apparent secret identity is Carlton's daughter's Kathy. When Batman frees Kathy, Bane uses Carlton as a hostage to lure the pair to him. While Kathy rescues Carlton, Bane fights Batman aboard the burning yacht where the villain severely injures the Dark Knight after a long and brutal battle. However, the Caped Crusader manages to cut Bane's Venom supply with Rocky Ballantine's advanced alloy, and he falls into a pit of fire to his presumed death (although Batman Beyond makes it clear that he survived).
 Bane makes a cameo appearance in the Batman Beyond episode "The Winning Edge". It is revealed that despite of Bruce Wayne's retirement from his role as Batman, he has been keeping track of Bane's whereabouts for twenty years after their final confrontation, and Venom has since become common and used in a patch form called "slappers". The new Batman learns that a lifetime of Venom abuse has taken its toll on Bane and he is now a frail, comatose old man reliant on an oxygen tank and regular infusions of Venom to stay alive.

Other series
 After the release of The Dark Knight Rises, Bane was parodied in the South Park "Insecurity" where several of the characters (such as Eric Cartman and Randy Marsh) disguise themselves as Bane to rob the UPS man. The mask itself was altered before the episode premiered.
 Bane appears in The Batman, voiced by Joaquim de Almeida (in "Traction"), Ron Perlman (in "Team Penguin"), and Clancy Brown (in "The Batman/Superman Story"). Debuting in the episode "Traction", this version's Venom-enhanced form is depicted as having red skin.
 Bane appears in Batman: The Brave and the Bold, voiced by Michael Dorn. He is featured in the episode "Menace of the Conqueror Caveman", where he fights Batman and Wildcat, and also appears "Sidekicks Assemble!" and "Night of the Batmen!".
 Bane appears in Young Justice, voiced by Danny Trejo. In the episode "Drop Zone", Bane is engaged in a war against the cult Kobra over the production of his drug, Venom, on the island of Santa Prisca. In "Usual Suspects", Bane allows Lex Luthor and Queen Bee to use Santa Prisca as a meeting venue for the Light's agents. In the third season, it is revealed that Bane broke his addiction to Venom, and allied himself with Deathstroke, Lady Shiva, and the League of Shadows to run a metahuman trafficking ring on Santa Prisca.
 Bane appears in numerous episodes of Teen Titans Go! before making his speaking appearance in "The Great Holiday Escape", voiced again by James Adomian.
 In the Justice League Action episode "System Failure", a robotic duplicate of Bane was seen assisting robotic duplicates of several other villains in taking down Batman, Superman, Wonder Woman, Cyborg, and Booster Gold.
 Bane is a recurring character in Harley Quinn, voiced by James Adomian. While his appearance is based on the comics, his voice is a direct parody of Tom Hardy's portrayal in The Dark Knight Rises. Additionally, he is depicted as more dim-witted compared to other incarnations and obsessed with blowing up anyone or anything that antagonizes him for any reason. He makes scattered minor appearances throughout the first season, which are usually played for comedic effect. Bane receives a major role in the second season as part of the Injustice League alongside the Riddler, Penguin, Two-Face, and Mr. Freeze, who took over Gotham following its destruction by the Joker. Despite being a member however, the others often treat Bane like a flunky, especially Two-Face. Following the Injustice League's dissolution, Bane continues to make recurring appearance throughout the series. In the third season, he receives his own mini-arc wherein he begins questioning his life choices and attending therapy, while also harboring a grudge against Harley Quinn and Poison Ivy for refusing to return his pasta-maker that he brought to Ivy and Kite Man's failed wedding, though he eventually forgives them after Harley saves him from being turned into a zombie in the episode "Climax at Jazzapajizza". In "A Very Problematic Valentine's Day Special", Harley, Ivy and Clayface stop a naked, kaiju-sized, sex-crazed Bane from destroying Gotham after he suffers an adverse reaction to a penis-enlarging potion combined with exposure to an extra-potent dose of Ivy's pheromones.
Bane appears in the DC Super Hero Girls episode "#AcceptNoSubstitute", voiced again by Eric Lopez. He has assumed the civilian identity of Diego Dorrance, an art teacher at Metropolis High School, and is stealing chemicals from its science lab to boost his strength.

Film

Live-action

Batman & Robin (1997)

A different version of Bane appears in Batman & Robin (1997), portrayed by former WCW wrestler Robert "Jeep" Swenson in one of his last film roles before his death. In the film, incarcerated serial killer Antonio Diego (portrayed by Michael Reid MacKay) is transformed, against his will, into "Bane" with an experimental drug called "Venom" by mad scientist Jason Woodrue. In this interpretation, in stark contrast to his intelligent and cunning comics counterpart, Bane is an inarticulate thug who serves as the bodyguard/henchman of Poison Ivy and is barely capable of speech. In the film's climax, Bane fights and nearly kills Robin and Batgirl, who manage to weaken and kick the Venom tube out of the back of his head, which changes him back to his frail self. Following the defeat of Mr. Freeze and Poison Ivy, Bane's fate is left unrevealed. This version of the character was one of many aspects of the film which received negative criticism from fans and critics alike.

The Dark Knight Rises (2012)

Bane appears in The Dark Knight Rises, portrayed by Tom Hardy. Prior to the film's release, Bane's voice received some criticism for being unintelligible due to his mask. Speaking to Entertainment Weekly, Christopher Nolan said "I think when people see the film, things will come into focus. Bane is very complex and very interesting and when people see the finished film people will be very entertained by him." "We wanted a very physical monster. We wanted more of the Darth Vader, if you like, and that was very important in the story dynamics." Hardy himself also commented on the voice in another interview with Entertainment Weekly, saying "It’s a risk, because we could be laughed at—or it could be very fresh and exciting", and that "The audience mustn’t be too concerned about the mumbly voice... As the film progresses, I think you’ll be able to tune to its setting." Hardy says the voice he developed had several influences, including Bane's intellect, Caribbean heritage, and in particular, bare-knuckle fighter Bartley Gorman.

Bane has been described as having "the physicality of a silverback gorilla" and is shown to have superhuman levels of strength in certain instances throughout the film, such as punching holes in limestone pillars, ripping his wrists out of handcuffs, easily breaking a soldier's neck with one hand, lifting Batman's armored body by the throat with a single outstretched arm, and cracking his impact-resistant cowl. Hardy describes Bane's fighting style as "Brutal. He's a big dude who's incredibly clinical, in the fact that he has a result-based and oriented fighting style. It's not about fighting. It's about carnage. The style is heavy-handed, heavy-footed, it's nasty. Anything from small-joint manipulation to crushing skulls, crushing rib cages, stamping on shins and knees and necks."

Bane is the self-proclaimed leader of a revolution against the rich and the corrupt, who he contends are oppressing "the people", and keeping them subservient with "myths of opportunity". Political theorist and cultural critic Slavoj Žižek sees Bane as fighting "structural injustice", while likening him to a modern-day Che Guevara who is counter-intuitively driven to violence out of a sense of love. Others have compared Bane to a "high-tech Robespierre on steroids", a melded triad of Lenin, bin Laden and Steve Austin set on fomenting "proletarian retribution", and "the one thing that's worse than the second film's raving anarchist: a demagogue." For his part, Nolan has said that his draft for the script was inspired by Charles Dickens' 1859 classic novel A Tale of Two Cities, centered around the French Revolution. This homage to Dickens' story is briefly illustrated by having Bane inconspicuously finger knit paracord (incidentally a real-life habit of Hardy's) in one scene of the film, symbolizing his Reign of Terror-based character Madame Defarge from the book.

While little information is given about Bane's backstory, he is said to have been born and raised in a centuries-old foreign penitentiary known as "the Pit", where he spent most of his life incarcerated as a prisoner. Although the viewer is led to believe he had escaped the prison as a child, it is later revealed that he was the friend of Talia al Ghul, a young girl whose mother, the daughter of a local warlord, gave birth to in the Pit after being banished there by her father. After the mother was killed by the prison's inmates, Bane protected the girl until the latter finally escaped. However, Bane was attacked by the other inmates, which left him in "perpetual agony" as a result of his injuries and the prison doctor's inept attempts to treat them; in lieu of his addiction to Venom in the comics, he instead wears a mask that provides him with a constant stream of analgesic gas that keeps his pain just below the threshold. Bane was then rescued and recruited by Talia's father, Ra's al Ghul (Liam Neeson), into the League of Shadows, though Ra's eventually excommunicated him for being a reminder of the prison that Talia's mother was left to die in. After Ra's' death during the events of Batman Begins, however, Bane rejoined the League as its new leader alongside Talia.

Six months before the main plot begins, Bane poses as one of his own mercenaries to infiltrate a meeting between a CIA agent named Bill Wilson and nuclear physicist Dr. Leonid Pavel. After he and his men destroy CIA's plane, Bane kidnaps Dr. Pavel and forces him to convert a stolen Wayne Enterprises fusion reactor into an atomic bomb, which Bane intends to use to destroy Gotham. In the present day narrative, Bane sets up his base in the city's tunnels, where he captures Gotham Police Commissioner James Gordon, who escapes shortly afterwards. Masquerading as an enforcer of John Daggett, Bane bankrupts Dagget's business rival Bruce Wayne by orchestrating a raid at the Gotham Stock Exchange and using Wayne's fingerprints to verify fraudulent futures exchange trades. After killing Daggett, Bane forces cat-burglar Selina Kyle to lure Batman to his lair. Bane subsequently breaks Batman's back and condemns him to the Pit where he reveals his plan: to fulfill Ra's al Ghul's destiny, he will psychologically torture Batman and Gotham for several months before detonating the bomb, destroying the city in an atomic blast.

To this effect, Bane lures Gotham's police underground and uses explosives to trap them and destroy the bridges surrounding the city. At a football game, Bane kills Mayor Anthony Garcia by detonating his viewing box and then kills Dr. Pavel before reading Gordon's resignation speech, exposing the crimes of district attorney Harvey Dent and their subsequent cover-up. Broadcasting that he wants to liberate Gotham from the corrupt and wealthy elite after reading the information, Bane releases the prisoners of Blackgate Prison, initiating anarchy while holding the city hostage and isolated with the bomb. Months later, Bane discovers that Batman has escaped from the Pit, returned to Gotham, and freed the trapped GCPD from the sewers. The police then clash with Bane's army in the streets outside the Gotham City Hall. Batman battles Bane in the midst of the chaos and damages his mask, cutting off his supply of painkillers and rendering him helpless. Talia — who was masquerading as Wayne Enterprises CEO Miranda Tate — intervenes by stabbing Batman. She fixes Bane's mask and activates the detonator, but Gordon blocks her signal. Talia leaves to detonate the bomb while Bane prepares to execute Batman, but Selina appears and fires the Batpod's cannons at Bane, killing him.

Hardy's portrayal of Bane was positively received, and the character is considered one of the best villains in film history.

Animation
 Bane appears in the animated film Superman/Batman: Public Enemies but has no dialogue and merely grunts. Along with several supervillains, Bane tried to collect the billion-dollar bounty on Superman. He briefly fights Batman but was defeated when Batman used his batarang to cut his Venom tube and knock him out with a single kick.
 Bane appears in Justice League: Doom, voiced by Carlos Alazraqui. This version is a member of the Legion of Doom.
 Bane appears in Lego Batman: The Movie - DC Super Heroes Unite, an adaptation of the video game of the same name, with Steve Blum reprising his role.
 Bane appears in Batman: Assault on Arkham. At the end of the film, the Joker releases Bane and several other inmates from Arkham Asylum to distract Batman while he sets off a bomb that could destroy half of Gotham. During the riot, Bane attacks Killer Frost while trying to escape from Arkham by throwing the police car Killer Frost was trying to escape in, causing it to explode. Later, Bane is attempts to escape Arkham Island via the Gotham bridge, where he prepares to attack Commissioner Gordon. However, Batman defeats Bane by cutting his venom supply, causing him to fall into Gotham river.
 Bane is featured in Batman Unlimited: Mechs vs. Mutants voiced again by Carlos Alazraqui. He is one of the convicts freed from Arkham Asylum by the Penguin and Mr. Freeze, and his Venom-infused blood is used to create Freeze's growth concoction. He later injects himself with the substance and grows to enormous size, which allows him to fight his nemesis Killer Croc. He is later defeated by Batman and shrunk back to normal size.
 Bane appears in Lego DC Comics Super Heroes: Justice League: Gotham City Breakout voiced by Eric Bauza. He takes over a kingdom of humanoids known as the Trogowogs with help from Deathstroke, but is defeated by Batman, Batgirl and Nightwing.
 Bane appears in The Lego Batman Movie voiced by Doug Benson. His appearance is a hybrid of the comic version and Tom Hardy's portrayal in The Dark Knight Rises.
 A Feudal Japan sumo wrestler version of Bane appears in Batman Ninja, voiced by Kenta Miyake.
 Bane appears in Batman vs. Teenage Mutant Ninja Turtles, voiced again by Carlos Alazraqui. Unlike the comic where he was mutated into an African Elephant, he instead becomes a mutant jaguar. Bane fights Batgirl and Donatello and initially gains the upper hand, but ultimately loses after he injures his knee from trying to break Donatello's back on it due to Donatello's shell.
 Bane appears in Batman: Hush, voiced by Adam Gifford. Bane essentially takes the role of Killer Croc from the Hush storyline, which the film is based on. With the help of his gang, he kidnaps a wealthy child for ransom. After being subdued by Batman, Bane escapes from Amanda Waller's imprisonment. He is later recaptured by joint efforts of Catwoman, Batman and Waller.
 Bane has a non-speaking appearance in Justice League Dark: Apokolips War. He is shown to be a member of the Suicide Squad under Harley Quinn's leadership. He and the Squad assist the surviving heroes in assaulting the main LexCorp building for the Boom Tube gate. After Clark Kent's team is teleported to Apokolips, Bane is with the Squad, Lois Lane and Lex Luthor defending the building from the invading Paradooms. Despite equipped with Kryptonite-powered venom, he is later overwhelmed and eaten alive by a swarm of them.

Video games

Lego

 Bane appears as a playable character in Lego Batman: The Videogame, with his vocal effects provided by Fred Tatasciore. He has super strength, immunity to toxins, and a special "back breaker" move (which awards the player with a Trophy on the Xbox 360 version if used on Batman, as a reference to the Knightfall story arc). In the game's story, Bane is depicted a lieutenant of the Penguin and appears in the first level of the second villain chapter, "Power Crazed Penguin", where he helps the Penguin obtain a satellite dish that the latter needs for his plans. After obtaining the satellite dish, however, the Penguin betrays Bane and abadons him as the latter is cornered by the Gotham City Police Department. This enrages Bane and he goes on a rampage until he is eventually taken into custody after being knocked down by a police car that was too heavy for him to lift. In the hero storyline, Bane is later seen in Arkham Asylum, still furious and trying to break out of his cell, albeit unsuccessfully. Bane has the distinction of being the only villain in the game who is never encountered by Batman and Robin during the hero storyline, due to him already being captured by the time the Dynamic Duo go after the Penguin's group.
 Bane appears as a playable character and boss in Lego Batman 2: DC Super Heroes, voiced by Steve Blum. In the level "Arkham Asylum Antics", he drives his Mole Machine alongside Poison Ivy and the Penguin around the maze in Arkham Asylum's courtyard, until all three villains are subdued by Batman and Robin and re-captured. Bane can later be encountered as an optional boss on Gotham Beach. After defeating him, he is unlocked as a playable character.
 Bane appears as a playable character in Lego Batman 3: Beyond Gotham, voiced by JB Blanc. In the game, he is manually able to change from a normal-sized minifigure to a Venom-powered big-figure, which is required to get a Trophy called "Bane is Gain". The Dark Knight Rises version of Bane is also playable via DLC.
 Bane is a playable character and boss in Lego Dimensions, with Steve Blum reprising his role once more. He also plays a minor role in the game's story, and is first seen stealing Kryptonite to defeat Superman. Batman and Robin give chase, but a dimensional vortex sucks in Robin (who managed to recover the Kryptonite stolen by Bane), who Batman then goes after. Bane later makes a cameo as one of the villains working for Lord Vortech and is one of the final bosses.
 Bane appears as a playable character in Lego DC Super-Villains, voiced again by JB Blanc.

Batman: Arkham
Bane appears in the Batman: Arkham series, voiced by Fred Tatasciore in Arkham Asylum and Arkham City and by JB Blanc in Arkham Origins.

 In his first appearance in Batman: Arkham Asylum, Bane is a patient at the titular asylum, where he is secretly being used as a human test subject by one of the facility's doctors, Penelope Young, who was hired by the Joker (under the alias "Jack White") to create a more powerful and unstable version of Bane's Venom formula called "Titan". When Batman first encounters Bane, the latter is physically weak and emaciated as a result of Young's experiments, which drained most of the Venom from his system. The Joker remotely pumps Venom into Bane's system, restoring his strength and muscular physique, and releases him so that he may go after Batman. Bane almost overpowers the Dark Knight, but is defeated after the latter summons his Batmobile, which rams Bane and sends him flying into the nearby river. In a post-credits scene, Bane's hand is seen rising from the river and grabbing a floating crate of Titan.
 In Batman: Arkham City, Bane is seen as an inmate of the titular city-prison. In the side mission "Fragile Alliance", Bane enlists Batman's help in finding and destroying the remaining Titan canisters around Arkham. After Batman destroys half of the canisters, he returns to Bane, only to discover that the latter lied to him and actually kept the canisters he found, so that he would be the only person with access to Titan. Having predicted Bane's betrayal, Batman traps him in a defunct elevator and destroys the last of the Titan canisters.
 In the prequel Batman: Arkham Origins, a younger Bane works as a mercenary and contract killer who heads his own militia, and appears to already have history with Batman. His design is also drastically different from his appearance in Asylum and City, and is a composite between his traditional comic book design and his design in The Dark Knight Rises. Unlike the previous two games, Origins showcases more of Bane's character staples from the comics, particularly his intelligence and addiction to the Venom formula. On Christmas Eve, Bane is one of eight assassins hired by the Joker to kill Batman. After the Dark Knight bests most of the other assassins, Bane, anticipating that Batman would target the Joker next, waits for him to arrive at the Gotham Royal Hotel, where the two fight on a balcony while the Joker watches them. When Alfred calls the GCPD to assist Batman, Bane escapes in a helicopter with his henchmen, though not before firing a rocket at the Joker, forcing Batman to save the latter's life. Later, Batman manages to find Bane's hideout, only to discover that the latter has deduced his secret identity and has already left to attack the Batcave. Batman is unable to stop Bane due to being forced to deal with Firefly, and only arrives at the Batcave after it has already been devastated by Bane, with Alfred left in a near-death state. In the game's climax, Bane reluctantly teams up with the Joker once again, and helps him take over the Blackgate Penitentiary. When Batman arrives to stop the riot, he is forced to fight Bane again, who this time is wearing a heart monitor connected to an electric chair the Joker is sitting in; if Batman does not kill Bane before his heartbeat charges the chair, the Joker will be killed instead, thus forcing Batman to break his no-killing vow either way. Batman manages to temporarily stop Bane's heartbeat before reviving him with the Electrocutioner's gloves. However, this enrages Bane, and he injects himself with a new strain of Venom called TN-1, turning himself into a hulking monster. Batman defeats Bane once again using electricity, and the brain damage the latter suffered causes him to forget Batman's identity. Bane is later shown being apprehended by the GCPD, and although it is implied he eventually undergoes treatment to recover from the effects of TN-1, his physical transformation is permanent.
 Bane also appears in Arkham Origins''' multiplayer mode as a playable character. The premise of this mode is that Bane's militia and the Joker's gang are engaged in a gang war, with Batman and Robin trying to stop both sides. If a player controlling a Bane Elite gets to the entrance door first, the Elite is replaced with Bane. Bane is equipped with a powerful rocket launcher, and is capable of performing devastating melee attacks, including a shock wave that knocks down enemies, and instant kills that vary based on the enemy's position (thrown across the room if standing, picked up and slammed down if prone, and slammed into a wall if near one). If Bane initiates an instant kill on Batman or Robin, he performs his signature backbreaker move.
 Bane makes a non-speaking cameo appearance in the spin-off game Batman: Arkham Origins Blackgate. Taking place three months after the events of Arkham Origins, Bane has been incarcerated in the eponymous prison, until Amanda Waller hires Catwoman to break him out for unknown reasons. After manipulating Batman into helping her get access to the prison's Arkham Wing, where Bane is kept, Catwoman tries to flee with the latter while Batman is distracted, but the Dark Knight eventually catches up to them and defeats Catwoman. Both Bane and Catwoman are then taken into custody by Waller and Rick Flag, though they are later forced to hand Bane over to the police to avoid suspicion that they were responsible for the break-out.
 While Bane does not appear in Batman: Arkham Knight, his teddy bear and Titan canister appear in the Gotham City Police Department's archived evidence room. Additionally, GCPD officer Aaron Cash mentions to Batman that Bane had to be released from custody after the shutdown of Arkham City, and that he was suffering from severe Titan withdrawal at the time of his release. While exploring the city, Batman can discover some of Bane's belongings in a shipping container, which reveals that he has returned to his birthplace of Santa Prisca and launched a campaign against the drug lords who run the island.

Injustice
Fred Tatasciore reprises his role as Bane in both Injustice: Gods Among Us and its sequel, Injustice 2.
 In Injustice: Gods Among Us, his "Prime" universe incarnation is first seen with Lex Luthor, Catwoman and Solomon Grundy fighting Nightwing, Cyborg and Raven aboard the Watchtower until he is defeated by Batman. Later on, his One-Earth dimension incarnation is seen as one of the Regime forces in the assault on the Insurgency headquarters that fights Wonder Woman until the latter is teleported to Themyscira by Ares and is later knocked out by the "Prime" Batman and Insurgency Batman. In the tie-in comics, it is revealed that Bane was the first supervillain Superman recruited into the Regime. In his non-canonical Arcade ending, after defeating Superman, Bane recruits Sinestro and Black Adam to rule the Earth alongside him. However, this ruling triad would only continue until the next phase of Bane's plan.
 In Injustice 2, Bane has joined the Society after the Regime's fall and battles Green Arrow, Black Canary, Green Lantern, Catwoman and Cyborg in the story. He suspects Catwoman to be a mole in the Society though his attempts to warn Gorilla Grodd go unheeded. He considers Cyborg to be his old comrade from their time in the Regime, though Cyborg admits he never agreed with Superman's choice to recruit criminals like Bane. Bane then notes the irony that Cyborg is now considered criminal just like him, before stating that Cyborg must ask himself what is the difference between them now. In his Arcade ending, after defeating Brainiac, Bane takes advantage of his newfound reputation as Earth's savior and releases a number of prisoners to overthrow the government, but quickly grows bored when he realizes there is no one left to fight.

Other games
 Bane is a boss character in the Batman & Robin video game adaptation (1997), and Batman: Chaos in Gotham (2001).
 Héctor Elizondo reprised his role as Bane in Batman: Rise of Sin Tzu.
 Bane appears as a first boss in London in the DS version of Batman: The Brave and the Bold – The Videogame.
 Bane is featured in DC Universe Online, voiced by E. Jason Liebrecht. He has been supplying a new type of Venom throughout Gotham City with his hideout being the Cape Carmine Lighthouse. If the player takes the hero campaign, he/she will be assisted by Nightwing. If the player takes the villain campaign, he/she will be assisted by Killer Croc. Bane's henchmen consist of Hoppers, Juicers, Lieutenants, Muscles, Razors, Retaliators, Splints, Street Soldiers, Strongmen, Venomized Dogs, Envenomed Hoppers, Envenomed Guard Dogs, Envenomed Juicers, Envenomed Lieutenants, Envenomed Retaliators, Envenomed Street Soldiers, Envenomed Strongmen, and Venom Supplier Diego. In the Last Laugh DLC pack, Hero players may encounter Bane once again in the Shady Nightclub duo, an instance that generates three random Villains (others being the Ultra Humanite, Killer Croc, Killer Frost or Parasite). In this instance, his voice acting receives a little addition: he speaks in Spanish when the players attack him, saying "Madre de Dios" (mother of God) and "Basta!" (enough!). Bane can also be unlocked to use in Player Versus Player Legends matches, using a strong Brawling fight style. If a player using Bane defeats an enemy player using Batman, the player will get a feat called Breaking the Bat.
 Bane appears as a boss for Young Justice: Legacy, voiced by Eric Lopez. During the Team's mission in Santa Prisca, he aids Lex Luthor and Black Manta in containing a piece of an ancient statue. Bane confronts the Team, taunting Aqualad about his mentor's possible death before fighting him.
 Bane makes several appearances in the iPad and iPhone game app released to coincide with The Dark Knight Rises. In this version, Bane has a shaved head instead of being completely bald and wields a shoulder-holstered handgun. Bane confronts Batman in the armory instead of the sewers, and beats him nearly to death, but does not break his back. Bane and his mercenaries attack civilians and set bombs on buildings on Bane's orders.
 In the 2013 arcade game Batman, Bane breaks out of Arkham Asylum, and begins taking control of Gotham. Batman thwarts this, and Bane, in a last stand, attacks Batman with a helicopter. Batman destroys the helicopter by ramming it with the Batmobile, taking Bane into custody. In his cell in Arkham, Bane swears vengeance on Batman.
 Bane appears in the second season of Telltale's Batman series, Batman: The Enemy Within, with JB Blanc reprising his role from Batman: Arkham Origins. This version of the character has tattoos, facial hair and initially did not use the tube system. Instead, Venom was inserted into his body through injections from a syringe gun. Bane is a member of the Pact alongside the Riddler, "John Doe", Harley Quinn, and Mr. Freeze, having joined the group to gain access to the LOTUS virus to cure his addiction to Venom and also due to being close friends with the Riddler. He is the second member of the group encountered by Batman and nearly kills the vigilante during an assault on the GCPD's weapons storage. When Bruce Wayne joins the group, Bane remains cautious of him and his motives, eventually deducing he is an Agency mole. In one of the earlier missions with the Pact, should Bruce interact with Amanda Waller, he will be given a fake Venom formula to slip on Bane. He is later captured during an assault on the SANCTUS lab, being knocked out by either the Agency operatives or Batman. If the Joker becomes a vigilante, Bane, now with a new version of Venom and tube system to take the steroid, is deployed by the Agency to subdue him and Batman, believing the new vigilante to be responsible for the Riddler's death. Bane is also part of Waller's group of supervillains that engage Batman and Joker on the rooftops of the GCPD. After Batman saves Waller from the Joker, he can negotiate for Bane's release so he can stand trial.
 Bane appears as a summonable character in Scribblenauts Unmasked: A DC Comics Adventure.

Toys and collectibles
 Kenner released different versions of Bane for each of its Batman: The Animated Series, Batman & Robin, and Legends of the Dark Knight action figure lines.
 DC Direct has released two Bane figures, one as the character appeared in the Batman "Knightfall" comic series as well as in the "Secret Files & Origins" series.  Each came packaged with a figure stand specific to that particular series, with no other accessories.
 Mattel has included two versions of Bane in their D.C. Superheroes line of action figures. Both versions share the same mold and only vary in paint applications. The first version is set apart by black pants while the second (2007) version has pants decorated with a camouflage pattern. Both versions of this figure came with a small "Osito" accessory, although many of the first version seem to have been shipped to stores without.
 In 2007, LEGO released a Bane mini-figure in a Bat-Tank building set, alongside a Riddler mini-figure.
 Mattel has produced several Bane figures. They first released an action figure of Bane from The Batman animated series with a "bashing action" gimmick, a version from The New Batman Adventures in the Justice League Unlimited toyline in a Matty Collector exclusive four pack, a build-a-figure version in Wave 16 of the DC Universe Classics Action Figures (Jonah Hex (left leg), Riddler (left arm with Venom tube), The Creeper (right arm), Robin (lower torso and head), Mercury of the Metal Men (upper torso), and Azrael (right leg)). When put together they become a 7.5 inch tall Bane.
 Several toys of Bane were made following up to the release of The Dark Knight Rises. Collectible figures were made by Hot Toys and Mattel, vinyl figures by POP Heroes, and bobble heads by NECA and Wacky Wobbler.
 In late 2012, LEGO released a minifigure of the Tom Hardy version of Bane from The Dark Knight Rises.
 Square Enix has released a Play Arts Kai figure of Bane, based on his The Dark Knight Rises incarnation.
 There have been several versions of Bane in the collectable miniature game "Heroclix". There were three versions in the first DC set "Hypertime", another in the "Batman Alpha" set, one in the DC 75th Anniversary set, three in the "Dark Knight Rises" set, one in the "Tab-App" set, and another one in the "Batman: Arkham Origins" set.
 DC Collectibles has released three Bane figures thus far: An Arkham Asylum Bane included in a two pack with Batman, an Arkham Origins Bane, and finally a The New Batman Adventures Bane figure.
 Medicom Toy has released a MAFEX Bane action figure in their The Dark Knight Trilogy line, based on his appearance in The Dark Knight Rises.

Music
The album Knightfall by Swedish band Silent Images, is based on the Batman: Knightfall'' story arc, with Bane cast as a central character. Throughout the course of the album and its lyrics, he is referred to as "The Venomous One", and is depicted as a militaristic Übermensch, with an uncanny and almost homoerotic connection to Batman.

References